A list of active and extinct submarine volcanoes and seamounts located under the world's oceans. There are estimated to be 40,000 to 55,000 seamounts in the global oceans. Almost all are not well-mapped and many may not have been identified at all. Most are unnamed and unexplored. This list is therefore confined to seamounts that are notable enough to have been named and/or explored.

List

See also
 Lists of volcanoes
 
 
 List of seamounts in the Southern Ocean

References

 Submarine volcanoes